Halocalculus aciditolerans is a halophilic archaeon in the family of Halobacteriaceae and the only described species in the genus Halocalculus (common abbreviation Hcl.).

References

Halobacteria
Monotypic archaea genera
Archaea genera
Taxa described in 2015

Archaea described in 2015